Mario Sapag (born Antonio Sapag; 1930–2012), was an Argentinian actor, comedian and impersonator. He was perhaps the country's best-known "Turco" (a term meaning "person of Middle Eastern descent" in Argentina) and TV personality during the 1980s.

Some of his most famous roles are featured in the TV series El hombre que volvió de la muerte (1969), El botón (1969) and Somos novios (1969).

References 

1930 births
Argentine people of Lebanese descent
2012 deaths
Argentine male television actors
Argentine male comedians
Male actors from Buenos Aires
20th-century Argentine male actors
21st-century Argentine male actors